A substance of very high concern (SVHC) is a chemical substance (or part of a group of chemical substances) concerning which it has been proposed that use within the European Union be subject to authorisation under the REACH Regulation. Indeed, listing of a substance as an SVHC by the European Chemicals Agency (ECHA) is the first step in the procedure for authorisation or restriction of use of a chemical. The first list of SVHCs was published on 28 October 2008 and the list has been updated many times to include new candidates. The most recent update occurred in January 2022 to include a total of 223 SVHC.

Criteria 
The criteria are given in article 57 of the REACH Regulation. A substance may be proposed as an SVHC if it meets one or more of the following criteria:
it is carcinogenic;
it is mutagenic;
it is toxic for reproduction;
it is persistent, bioaccumulative and toxic (PBT substances);
it is very persistent and very bioaccumulative (vPvB substances);
there is "scientific evidence of probable serious effects to human health or the environment which give rise to an equivalent level of concern"; such substances are identified on a case-by-case basis.

The "equivalent concern" criterion is significant because it is this classification which allows substances which are, for example, neurotoxic, endocrine-disrupting or otherwise present an unanticipated environmental health risk to be regulated under REACH.

Simply because a substance meets one or more of the criteria does not necessarily mean that it will be proposed as an SVHC. Many such substances are already subject to restrictions on their use within the European Union, such as those in Annex XVII of the REACH Regulation. SVHCs are substances for which the current restrictions on use (where these exist) might be insufficient. There are three priority groups for assessment:
PBT substances and vPvB substances;
substances which are widely dispersed during use;
substances which are used in large quantities.

Procedure for listing
Proposals for inclusion of a substance on the list of SVHCs can come either from the European Commission or one of the Member States of the European Union. The proposals are made public by the European Chemicals Agency (ECHA) and are open for public comment for 60–90 days. If the substance is deemed to meet one or more of the criteria, it is then listed as an SVHC.

Once a substance has been listed as an SVHC, the Agency commissions a technical report from one or more national or private laboratories, which analyses the available information on manufacture, imports, uses and releases of the substance, as well as possible alternatives. On the basis of this technical report, the Agency decides whether to prioritise the substance, in effect, whether to make a recommendation to the European Commission to add the substance to Annex XIV of the REACH Regulation, making its use subject to authorisation. The draft recommendations must be made public and opened for comment for three months before the final recommendations are sent to the Commission. The first draft recommendations were published on 14 January 2009, and new draft recommendations must be issued at least once every two years.

Consequences of listing
The list of SVHCs is primarily a public list of substances for which the European Chemicals Agency is considering imposing a requirement for authorisation for some or all uses. However, there are some direct consequences of including a substance on the list of SVHCs. Suppliers of pure SVHCs must provide their customers with a safety data sheet (SDS). Suppliers of mixtures of substances which contain more than 0.1% by weight of any SVHC must provide their customers with a safety data sheet on request. Manufacturers or importers of articles containing more than 0.1% by weight of any SVHC must provide their customers, and consumers on request, with adequate information on the safe use and disposal of the article, including the name of the SVHC(s) concerned. From 1 June 2011, manufacturers and importers of articles also have to notify the European Chemicals Agency of the quantities of SVHCs used in their articles.

In addition to the obviously involved chemical industry, there are many more industries affected by this regulation: drapery and leather industry, plastic processing, cosmetic industry, food industry, petroleum processing, printing industry, sports equipment industry, toys industry, recycling industry, electrical engineering industry, fine mechanics industry, optics industry, engine and plant production industry.

Candidate list of substances of very high concern 
The following substances are included on the candidate list of substance of very high concern. This list is updated at regular intervals by the European Chemicals Agency (ECHA), with the first substances listed on 28 October 2008. In June 2012, ECHA updated the Candidate List of Substances of Very High Concern (SVHC) for Authorization by including 13 new substances. Among the 13 newly added SVHCs on June 18, 2012, four of them (C.I. Basic Violet 3, C.I. Basic Blue 26, C.I. Solvent Blue 4 and 4,4'-bis(dimethylamino)-4'-(methylamino)trityl alcohol) are identified as SVHC only if the presence of the carcinogenic constituents Michler's ketone or Michler's base is ≥ 0.1% w/w. Therefore, all the proposed substances are carcinogenic, mutagenic and toxic for reproduction (CMR substances; H-phrases H340, H341, H350, H351, H360, H361), which may pose serious effects on human beings. 
To sell or use these substances, manufacturers, importers and users in the European Union (EU) need to apply for authorization from the ECHA.

This list is referred to as the "candidate" list because all substances placed on it are candidates for inclusion in Annex XIV of REACH. If a substance is added to Annex XIV, it is given a "latest application date" and a "sunset date". The sunset date is the date after which the substance cannot be used or imported into the EU without authorisation from the ECHA, and the latest application date is the date by which any applications for use must be submitted to the ECHA.

The most recent update is from July 2021; find the complete list in references.

Notes
The CAS numbers for groups of compounds such as "SCCP" are indicative. Such groups can include several compounds, each of which has a different CAS number.
PBT = persistent, bioaccumulative and toxic
vPvB = very persistent and very bioaccumulative

References

External links 
Candidate list of substances from ECHA
Authorisation List (Substances included in Annex XIV of REACH) from ECHA
Obligations Linked to the Candidate List of Substances of Very High Concern from ECHA
Definition of SVHC as in Article 57 of Regulation (EC) No 1907/2006 ("the REACH Regulation")

Hazardous materials
Regulation of chemicals in the European Union
Toxicology